John Fletcher (by 1490 – 1545 or later) was an English politician.

He was a Member (MP) of the Parliament of England for Rye in 1529, 1536 and 1542.

References

15th-century births
16th-century deaths
English MPs 1529–1536
English MPs 1536
English MPs 1542–1544